is a Japanese manga series written by Tomohiro Yokomaku and illustrated by Shūji Takeya. It was serialized in Grand Jump from June 2012 to January 2015, and compiled by Shueisha into ten tankōbon volumes.

It was adapted into a Japanese television drama series of the same name that debuted in April 2014.

Media

Manga
Smoking Gun - Minkan Kasōken Chōsa'in Nagareda Midori, written by Tomohiro Yokomaku and illustrated by Shūji Takeya, began its publication in Shueisha's seinen manga magazine Grand Jump on January 18, 2012. The manga finished on November 19, 2014. Shueisha compiled its individual chapters into ten tankōbon volumes released from June 19, 2012, to January 19, 2015.

Drama

In the 2014 4th issue of Grand Jump, it was announced that the manga would receive a Japanese television drama adaptation. Smoking Gun was broadcast on Fuji TV from April 9 to
June 18, 2014.

References

External links
 

Mystery anime and manga
Shueisha manga
Seinen manga